"Friends" is the second single from Jody Watley's second album, Larger Than Life.

History
"Friends", like her previous single "Real Love", became a multi-format top-10 smash, reaching the top ten of the pop, R&B and dance charts in the U.S., as well as being her biggest single in the UK since her debut, "Looking for a New Love". The song was one of the first ever to feature a rap artist (Eric B. & Rakim) and a singer.

"Friends" appeared in the Top 10, peaking at number nine for one week on the Billboard Hot 100. It peaked at number three on the Hot Black Singles chart and number seven on the Hot Dance Club Play chart.

In 2006, Watley remade the once successful song for her release of The Makeover, on her Avitone Records label, uniquely titled "Friendz," featuring rapper Voshaun Gotti.

Charts

References

Jody Watley songs
1989 singles
Songs written by André Cymone
Songs written by Jody Watley
1989 songs
MCA Records singles